P. Susheela is an Indian playback singer, associated with the South Indian cinema for over six decades. She has been recognized by both the Guinness Book of World Records and the Asia Book of Records for singing the most songs in different Indian languages by a female singer.

Recorded film songs 
This is only a partial list; P. Susheela has sung over 25,000 songs in Tamil, Telugu, Kannada, Malayalam and Hindi. Susheela has sung more the 6000 songs in Tamil only.

Tamil film songs

Kannada songs

Hindi songs

References 

Lists of songs recorded by Indian singers